Blood is the tenth studio album by singer-songwriter Allison Moorer. The album was released on October 25, 2019 and is her first release on her own record label Autotelic. The album was distributed by Thirty Tigers, who also distributed her 2017 duets album with her sister Shelby Lynne. It is a companion piece to Moorer's first autobiography Blood: A Memoir, which was released on October 29, 2019. Blood is Moorer's fourth album with producer Kenny Greenberg, who worked with her on her first two albums and on her 2015 release Down to Believing.

Background
Like Down to Believing, her previous solo release, Blood (and its associated memoir) is a collection of tracks relating the emotions and trauma that Moorer and Lynne went through during their childhoods growing up in a troubled home in southern Alabama which ultimately resulted in the murder-suicide of their parents in 1986. Moorer stated that she considers these songs to be her most revealing, personal and finest works to date.

The song "I'm the One to Blame", the only track on the album not written by Moorer, was composed by her sister Shelby Lynne, who found the unfinished lyrics to the song in one of their father's briefcases.

The album features re-recordings of "Cold Cold Earth" which appeared as a hidden track (due to Moorer's unwillingness to address the topic openly on an album) on Moorer's second album The Hardest Part, and "Blood", which featured on her 2015 album Down to Believing.

The cover of the album is a photograph of Moorer as a child looking happy, with the cover of the memoir being a similar photograph that also included Shelby Lynne.

Track listing

Personnel
Credits adapted from AllMusic.

Tony Castle - editing
Jim DeMain - mastering
Kenny Greenberg - bass, engineering, acoustic guitar, electric guitar, mixing, pedal steel, production
Evan Hutchings - drums
Jeff Linsenmaier - programming
Mills Logan - engineering, mixing
Mike McCarthy - engineering
Allison Moorer - lead vocals, backing vocals, bass drums, acoustic guitar, piano, tambourine
Justin Neibank - mixing
Steve Patrick - trumpet
Luke Reynolds - loops
Tammy Rogers - fiddle
Mike Walter - engineering

Commercial performance
The album debuted at No. 23 on the Heatseekers Albums chart. It sold 1,300 copies in the United States in the first two weeks. It has sold 2,100 copies in the United States as of December 2019.

Tour
The album was preceded by the release of "All I Wanted (Thanks Anyway)" and acts as a companion to Moorer's memoir of the same name, which was released on October 29, 2019. Moorer embarked upon a special hybrid tour which incorporated conversation about the book with performances of songs from the record alongside some of her earlier hits. On this tour, she was joined by special moderators who joined her in conversation including her husband Hayes Carll, her sister Shelby Lynne, Paul Janeway, Kyle Tibbs Jones, Jennifer Palmieri, NPR Music's Melissa Block, songwriter Mary Gauthier and music journalist Mario Taradell.

References

2019 albums
Allison Moorer albums
Albums produced by Kenny Greenberg